The 1989–90 season is FC Barcelona's 91st season in existence and the club's 59th consecutive season in the top flight of Spanish football.

Squad

Competitions

La Liga

League table

Results by Round

Matches

UEFA Cup Winners' Cup

UEFA Supercup

Copa del Rey

Eightfinals

Quarterfinals

Semifinals

Final

Friendlies

Statistics

Players statistics

External links

webdelcule.com

FC Barcelona seasons
Barcelona